Sembawang Secondary School is a co-educational government secondary school located in Sembawang, Singapore.

History

In the late 1990s, the housing estate of Sembawang began to expand. To meet the needs of the community, Sembawang Secondary School was established in January 1999. As the construction of the new premises was underway, the pioneering batch of Secondary 1 classes and school staff were housed temporarily at Woodlands Ring Secondary School. On 25 August 2001, the school finally was declared opened by Education Minister Tony Tan.

In 2008, the school celebrated its tenth anniversary. Lim Wee Kiak, a Member of Parliament for Sembawang GRC, joined the school in unveiling a celebratory sculpture erected at the school's foyer.

Principals

Awards
In total, three teachers from Sembawang Secondary School have been conferred the President's Awards for Teachers, which recognises their passion and perseverance in teaching.

External links
Official website

Notes

Secondary schools in Singapore
Sembawang